Dóra Keresztes (born 3 October 1953, Budapest) 
Hungarian painter, printmaker, illustrator, graphic designer and animated film director.

Biography

She graduated from the Hungarian University of Arts And Design in Budapest as pupil of István Balogh, György Haiman, János Kass and Ernő Rubik.  She started her career with book designs and illustrations mainly for children and contemporary Hungarian literature. Later on the film and theater posters came to the center of her interest and she was art director and designer of the „Muses” Cultural Magazine in Budapest. Beside her design activity she is an independent fine artist, stage designer and director of animated films. Her works have been shown in exhibitions, biennials and film festivals both in Hungary and abroad. Vice president of the Society of Hungarian Illustrators, film director in PannóniaFilm Studio, co-founder of Hungarian Poster Society. She works as a freelance designer in her own design studio.

Exhibitions 

 1985 Budapest, Vigadó Gallery
2000 Szeged, Kass Gallery
2001 Teheran, Artist Gallery
2005 Budapest, Dorottya Gallery
2005 Budapest, Hungarian National Theatre
2009 Budapest, Barabas Villa
2012 Moscow, State Children's Library
2012 Győr, Esterhazy Palace
2014 Hiroshima, Aster Plaza

Animated films

1979 – Moon Film (Holdasfilm) (with István Orosz)
1985 – Magic (Garabonciák) (with István Orosz)
1989 – Golden Bird (Aranymadár)
1996 – Faces (Arcok)
2001 - Smiling Sad Willow Tree (Mosolygó szomorúfűz)
2002 - De profundis
2005 - One-Two-Three (Egyedem-begyedem)

Stage design

2003 - Sándor Weöres: The Shipman on the Moon (Holdbeli csónakos) (Hungarian National Theatre)

Awards 

1977-2001 Main Prizes of the Beautiful Hungarian Book Competition (nine times)
1988 Award of the Biennial of Graphic Design, Brno
1994 The International Board on Books for Young People (IBBY) Award
2000 Gold Medal of the Millennium Competition of Hungarian Art Academy
2001 The International Board on Books for Young People (IBBY) Award

References

External links 

Dora Keresztes
her posters

Hungarian National Theatre

1953 births
Living people
20th-century Hungarian women artists
21st-century Hungarian women artists
Artists from Budapest
Hungarian painters
Hungarian illustrators
Film people from Budapest
Modern artists
Folk artists
Hungarian women illustrators
Hungarian women painters
Hungarian women animators
Hungarian animated film directors